Malakoff is a community in Rideau-Goulbourn Ward in Ottawa, Ontario.

History
By 1866, Malakoff was a post office in the township of Marlborough-26 miles from Ottawa, and 3 miles from North Gower; the postmaster was John Pierce. Citizens included Robert Kerr, who owned a hotel, and was a general merchant.

Neighbourhoods in Ottawa